Sniper! is a computer game that appeared on CompuServe.  It was an adaptation of the Sniper! board game.

Plot 
Sniper! is a strategy war-game. A player starts as a recruit in the Sniper Saloon & Salad Bar, where players can pick up local gossip, brag about wins, and explain defeats. There, players can also challenge other players to a Sniper! game, or play the computerized opponent. A drill instructor waits in the Bootcamp to show you new players how the game is played. The Halls of Fame also display players' best scores. In a game of Patrol two opposing squads, Alpha and Bravo, meet in no-man's land between their front lines. In a game of Infiltrate, the Alpha force must cross from one side of the map to the other, exiting the map at Bravo’s Victory Point area before Bravo can stop Alpha. The player has a small squad of soldiers to command, and plays either the Germans or the Americans, somewhere in western Europe during World War II.

Development 
Steve Estvanik converted TSR's Sniper! board-game series into a multi-player, online computer game for CompuServe.

Reception 
In the July 1989 edition of Computer Gaming World, Johnny Wilson gave the Sniper! videogame a generally positive review, admiring it both as a social experience as well as a competitive game.

In the January 1993 issue of Compute! (Issue 148), Paul C. Schuytema reviewed the Sniper! computer game, and suggested players pay for the graphical version rather than try to decipher images composed of ASCII characters, which he found "far too cryptic for my tastes." He noted that although "the game's control logistics seem a little obtuse at first, you can enter a modified boot camp where you explore all of the various commands."

References 

1989 video games
CompuServe
Computer wargames
Multiplayer online games
Sniper video games
Turn-based strategy video games
Video game cleanup
Video games about Nazi Germany
Video games based on board games
Video games developed in the United States
Video games set in Europe
World War II video games